William Patrick Anthony Crawford (3 August 1933 – 21 January 2009) was an Australian cricketer who played in four Tests, including one in England at Lord's in 1956 and three in India in 1956–57. He was born in Dubbo, New South Wales.

He was a right-arm fast bowler.

During the 1956 tour to England, Crawford was denied permission to have his pregnant wife accompany him on the sea voyage by the Australian Board of Control under its policy against spouses travelling with the team; she travelled separately.

Crawford suffered an injury during his debut Test at Lord's and bowled only 29 balls.

See also
 List of New South Wales representative cricketers

References

External links
"Pat Crawford" at Cricinfo
Pat Crawford at CricketArchive

1933 births
People from Dubbo
2009 deaths
Australia Test cricketers
New South Wales cricketers
Australian cricketers
Cricketers from New South Wales